Olly Dondokambey (born 18 November 1961) is an Indonesian politician and the governor of North Sulawesi province. Dondokambey held the office since 12 February 2016. Before elected governor, he was a representative from North Sulawesi to People's Representative Council of the Republic of Indonesia for two periods serving from 2004 till 2014.

Electronic ID Scandal
In 2018, he was implicated in the government electronic ID scandal centering around Setya Novanto. Novanto gave a list of names of his co-conspirators to the Corruption Eradication Commission, Dondokambey being included.

Career
On the 53rd anniversary of the province's establishment in 2017, he inaugurated a new provincial parliament building.

References

1961 births
Living people
People from Manado
Indonesian Democratic Party of Struggle politicians
Governors of North Sulawesi